The Air Forces of the National People's Army (LSK) was the Air Force of East Germany.

At the end of November 1953, a reorganisation of air units saw air units transferred from the Ministry of the Interior directly to the Deputy Minister and Chief of the People's Police. The air regiments were reorganized into the Aero Club 1 (Cottbus), 2 (Drewitz) and 3 (Bautzen), which in turn were divided into two sections. Starting in 1954, additional Z-126 and M-1D from Czechoslovakian production were made available.

On 1 March 1956 the air force was officially established as part of the National People's Army, following the GDR's entry into the Warsaw Pact alliance. It was intended to establish three fighter divisions, an attack aircraft division and an anti-aircraft division. However, eventually only the 1st and 3rd Aviation Divisions and the 1st Flak-Division were created.

The name Luftstreitkräfte applied originally to the air corps of the German Empire between 1910 and the end of World War I in 1918. However, the West German Air Force adopted the name '' as used by the Nazi-era air force from 1935 to the end of World War II.

Organization

 Transportfliegergeschwader 44 (TFG-44), Marxwalde
 I.Transportfliegerstaffel/TFG-44 (I.TFS/TFG-44), Tu-154M
 II.Transportfliegerstaffel/TFG-44 (II.TFS/TFG-44), Tu-134A
 III.Transporthubschrauberstaffel/TFG-44 (III.TFS/TFG-44), Mi-8S
 IV.Transportfliegerstaffel/TFG-44 (IV.TFS/TFG-44), Il-62M, Berlin/Schönefeld

1st Air Defence Division (1st LVD) 

The 1st  (en: Air Defence Division), with its HQ in Cottbus, was in charge to provide air defence throughout the southern territory of the GDR. The following units were subordinated to that particular division:
 Verbindungsfliegerkette 31 (VFK-31) An-2, Zlin-43, (Communication flight), Cottbus
  "Fritz Schmenkel", Holzdorf Air Base
 I.Jagdfliegerstaffel/JG-1 (I.JS/JG-1), MiG-21MF, MIG-21UM
 II.Jagdfliegerstaffel/JG-1 (II.JS/JG-1), MiG-21MF, MIG-21UM, MiG-21SPS-K
 III.Jagdfliegerstaffel/JG-1 (III.JS/JG-1), MiG-21MF, MIG-21UM
  "Willi Budich", Holzdorf (Jessen)
 , Holzdorf
  "Wladimir Komarow", Preschen Air Base
 I.Jagdfliegerstaffel/JG-1 (I.JS/JG-3), MiG-29A, MIG-29UB
 II.Jagdfliegerstaffel/JG-2 (II.JS/JG-3), MiG-29A, MIG-29UB
 III.Jagdfliegerstaffel/JG-3 (III.JS/JG-3), MiG-21MF-75, MIG-21UM
  "Walter Stoecker", Preschen
 , Preschen
  "Wilhelm Pieck", Drewitz Air Base (disbanded in 1989)
 I.Jagdbombenfliegerstaffel/JBG-7 (I.JBS/JBG-7), MiG-21MF, MIG-21UM
 II.Jagdbombenfliegerstaffel/JBG-7 (II.JBS/JBG-7), MiG-21MF, MIG-21UM
 , Drewitz
  "Hermann Matern", Marxwalde
 I.Jagdfliegerstaffel/JG-8 (I.JS/JG-8), MiG-21bis, MiG-21UM
 II.Jagdfliegerstaffel/JG-8 (II.JS/JG-8), MiG-21bis, MiG-21UM
 III.Jagdfliegerstaffel/JG-8 (III.JS/JG-8), MiG-21bis, MiG-21UM
 , Marxwalde
 , Marxwalde
  "Hermann Dunker", Ladeburg
 , Badingen
 , Fürstenwalde
 , Prötzel
 , Klosterfelde
 , Beetz near Kremmen
 , Schönermark
 , Fehrbellin
 , Zachow
 , Markgraf-Pieske
 , Ladeburg
 , Ladeburg
  "Werner Lamberz", Sprötau
 , Eckolstädt
 , Dietersdorf
 , Blankenburg
 , Seebergen
 , Remda
 , Eckolstädt
 , Sprötau
  "Jaroslaw Dombrowski", Straßgräbchen
 , Groß Döbern
 , Großräschen
 , Kroppen
 , Großröhrsdorf
 , Straßgräbchen
 , Döbern
  "Arvid Harnack", Holzdorf
  "Paul Schäfer", Sprötau
 , Müncheberg
  "August Willich", Cottbus

3rd Air Defence Division (3rd LVD) 
The 3rd , with its HQ in Trollenhagen, was in charge to provide air defence throughout the northern territory of the GDR. The following units were subordinated to that particular division:

 Verbindungsfliegerkette 33 (VFK-33) An-2, Zlin-43, (Communication flight), Trollenhagen Air Base
 , Trollenhagen
  "Juri Gagarin", Trollenhagen Air Base
 I.Jagdfliegerstaffel/JG-2 (I.JS/JG-2), MiG-21M, MiG-21UM
 II.Jagdfliegerstaffel/JG-2 (II.JS/JG-2), MiG-21M, MiG-21UM
 III.Jagdfliegerstaffel/JG-2 (III.JS/JG-2), MiG-21M, MiG-21UM
  "Herbert Baum", Trollenhagen
 , Trollenhagen
  "Heinrich Rau", Peenemünde Air Base
 I.Jagdfliegerstaffel/JG-9 (I.JS/JG-9), MiG-23ML
 II.Jagdfliegerstaffel/JG-9 (II.JS/JG-9), MiG-23MF, MiG-23UB
 III.Jagdfliegerstaffel/JG-9 (III.JS/JG-9), MiG-23ML
 Zieldarstellungskette 33 (ZDK-33), L-39V, L-39ZO, (Target towing flight)
  "Käthe Niederkirchner", Peenemünde
 , Peenemünde
  "Erich Weinert", Sanitz
 , Cammin/Prangendorf
 , Abtshagen
 , Barth
 , Hinrichshagen
 , Neuenkirchen
 , Barhöft
 , Nienhagen
 , Bastorf
 , Kirchdorf
 , Dranske
 , Retschow
 , Rövershagen
 , Sanitz
  "Etkar André", Parchim
 , Warin
 , Tramm
 , Ziegendorf
 , Steffenshagen
 , Parchim
  "Rudolf Breitscheid", Stallberg
 , Altwarp
 , Eichhof
 , Burg-Stargard
 , Weggun
  "Liselotte Herrmann", Pragsdorf
  "Fritz Behn", Pudagla
 , Parchim
  "Max Christiansen-Clausen", Trollenhagen

FO FMTFK 
All fighter-bomber aircraft, transport aircraft, reconnaissance aircraft and transport helicopters were under the control of the FO FMTFK (roughly translates into: "Lead unit of the Frontal and Military air units"). The following units were part of the FO FMTFK:

  "Klement Gottwald", Drewitz Air Base
 I.Jagdbombenfliegerstaffel/JBG-37 (I.JBS/JBG-37), MiG-23BN, MiG-23UB
 II.Jagdbombenfliegerstaffel/JBG-37 (II.JBS/JBG-37), MiG-23BN, MiG-23UB
 , Drewitz
 , Drewitz
  "Gebhardt Leberecht von Blücher", Laage Air Base
 I.Jagdbombenfliegerstaffel/JBG-77 (I.JBS/JBG-77), Su-22M-4, Su-22UM-3K
 II.Jagdbombenfliegerstaffel/JBG-77 (II.JBS/JBG-77), Su-22M-4, Su-22UM-3K
 , Laage
 , Laage
  "Paul Wieczorek", Laage Air Base
 I.Marinefliegerstaffel/MFG28 (I.MFS/MFG-28), Su-22M-4, Su-22UM-3K
 II.Marinefliegerstaffel/MFG28 (II.MFS/MFG-28), Su-22M-4, Su-22UM-3K
 , Laage
 , Laage
  "Werner Seelenbinder", Brandenburg-Briest
 I.Transporthubschrauberstaffel/THG-34 (I.THS/THG-34), Mi-8T
 II.Transporthubschrauberstaffel/THG-34 (II.THS/THG-34), Mi-8T
 , Brandenburg-Briest
 , Strausberg
 Verbindungsfliegerstaffel 14 (VS-14), An-2, L-410UVP, Zlin-43
 , Strausberg
 , Dresden-Klotzsche Airport
 Transportfliegerstaffel 24 (TS-24), An-26
 , Dresden-Klotzsche
 , MiG-21M, MiG-21UM, Preschen Air Base
 , MiG-21M, MiG-21UM, Drewitz Air Base

Offiziershochschule für Militärflieger 
The Offiziershochschule für Militärflieger (OHS MF) with its headquarters at Bautzen was the command responsible for providing training, it had the following assigned units:
 Fliegerausbildungsgeschwader 15 "Heinz Kapelle", Rothenburg
 I.Fliegerstaffel (I.FS), MiG-21SPS, MiG-21SPS-K, MiG-21U, MiG-21UM/US
 II.Fliegerstaffel (II.FS), MiG-21SPS, MiG-21SPS-K, MiG-21U, MiG-21UM/US
 III.Fliegerstaffel (III.FS), MiG-21SPS, MiG-21SPS-K, MiG-21U, MiG-21UM/US
 IV.Fliegerstaffel (IV.FS), MiG-21SPS, MiG-21SPS-K, MiG-21U, MiG-21UM/US
 V.Fliegerstaffel (V.FS), MiG-21SPS, MiG-21SPS-K, MiG-21U, MiG-21UM/US
 VI.Fliegerstaffel (VI.FS), MiG-21SPS, MiG-21SPS-K, MiG-21U, MiG-21UM/US
 Fliegerausbildungsgeschwader 25 "Leander Ratz", Bautzen
 I.Fliegerstaffel (I.FS), L-39ZO
 II.Fliegerstaffel (II.FS), L-39ZO
 III.Fliegerstaffel (III.FS), L-39ZO
 Hubschrauberausbildungsgeschwader 35 (HAG-35) "Lambert Horn", Brandenburg/Briest
 I.Hubschrauberstaffel/HAG-35 (I.HS/HAG-35), Mi-2
 II.Hubschrauberstaffel/HAG-35 (II.HS/HAG-35), Mi-8PS, Mi-8T
 Transportfliegerausbildungsstaffel 45 (TAS-45), An-2, L-410UVP, Zlin-43, Kamenz

Insignia 
A diamond-shaped symbol identified LSK aircraftdivided into vertical black, red, and gold stripes corresponding to the horizontal fesses or bars on the GDR state flag. The centre of the diamond portrayed the GDR coat of arms: a hammer and compass surrounded by a wreath of yellow grain.

Uniforms 

The uniforms of the two German air forces were also different: following an older German tradition, LSK/LV uniforms were the same stone gray worn by army personnel, modified by distinctive blue insignia (similar in style, but not colour, to World War II  ranks) and piping. West German uniforms, on the other hand, were blue with yellow insignia and more closely modelled on those worn by  personnel during World War II.

Aircraft 

Starting in 1953, East Germany received An-2, La-9, Yak-11, and Yak-18 aircraft and the MiG-15bis/UTI, MiG-17/Lim-5P, An-14A, Il-14P, MiG-9, MiG-19, Il-28, Mi-4, and Ka-26 in 1956 which were provided by the Soviet Union. The first MiG-21s were delivered in 1962. The 1970s saw the introduction of the MiG-23, while Su-22 fighter-bombers were delivered in the 1980s. The latest addition was the MiG-29 in 1988. The inventory also included Soviet-built helicopters along with trainers and other light aircraft manufactured in Czechoslovakia.

The East German Air Force was unique among Warsaw Pact countries in that it was often equipped with the most advanced Soviet fighters, instead of downgraded export models. As a result, it was under closer Soviet control than the air forces of other Warsaw Pact states.

After German reunification in 1990, the  assumed control over  equipment and enlisted some of its personnel. Many of the GDR's military aircraft were obsolete or incompatible with NATO technical standards, and were sold to other countries. However, the  did retain the MiG-29 in both air defense and aggressor roles because of its excellent capabilities.

LSK/LV equipment 

Equipment of the LSK/LV in 1989:

References

External links 

 Home.snafu.de
 Transportflieger.eu
 Luroko.de

 
1956 establishments in East Germany
1990 disestablishments in Germany
Military units and formations established in 1956
Military units and formations disestablished in 1990